Robert J. Houben (5 May 1905 – 11 April 1992) was a Belgian politician and a member of the Christian Social Party.

External links
 Robert J. Houben in ODIS - Online Database for Intermediary Structures
 Archives of Robert J. Houben in ODIS - Online Database for Intermediary Structures

1905 births
1992 deaths
Academic staff of KU Leuven
Christlich Soziale Partei (Belgium) politicians